Cinema Paradiso is a UK-based DVD-by-mail company which specialises in world and arthouse cinema but also caters for mainstream tastes as well with over 80,000 titles films and 5000+ Blu-ray high definition titles available. They operate a system which divides film info for each title by genre and special features on the disc. They also carry a list of over 5000 foreign language DVDs from Hollywood to Bollywood, Argentina to Vietnam, Tajikistan to Mongolia.

History
Cinema Paradiso is privately owned company which was established in 2003 in Lewisham, South London and is currently headquartered in Brentford,  West London, England,  UK. In 2005 the company bought Zoovies.net, and in the following year acquired DVDsToMe.

Awards
 Won  Ethical Consumer's best buy award in July 2013
Top DVD rental sites.

References

DVD companies of the United Kingdom
Video rental services
2003 establishments in the United Kingdom